Carved elephant tusk depicting Buddha life stories is an intricately carved complete single tusk now exhibited at the Decorative Arts gallery, National Museum, New Delhi, India. This tusk was donated to the Museum. This tusk, which is nearly five foot long, illustrates forty three events in the life of the Buddha and is thought to have been made by early 20th century craftsmen from the Delhi region.

Description
The use of the complete ivory tusks for carving was popular in 18th and 19th century India, particularly in the Delhi region apart from Burma. Similar whole tusk carvings are also found in the Ivory Coast, Congo and Benin but made from the tusks of African elephants.

The art of ivory carving in India is very ancient with references found in Kalidasa's Meghadūta. The earliest ivory carving from the Indian region is comb dating to the 2nd century CE found at Taxila. Ivory carving flourished in Assam and Mysore where elephants were available and the art of ivory carving had royal patronage. Ivory was an object of trade between kingdoms and they found their way into areas where the art of carving had patronage.

This ivory tusk illustrates important life events of Buddha in 43 circular roundel, first 25 referring to the story of Buddha's birth to his enlightenment followed by 18 depicting his life events from enlightenment to Mahaparinirvana. Similar scenes have been presented in sculptures and paintings many a times but this ivory tusk shows few new scenes of Buddha's life such as Siddharatha's fight for a bird, his move against animal sacrifice and realization of death. As the thickness of the tusk reduces upwards, one can see at the tip three well-known postures depicting Bhumisparsha mudra, Abhayamudra and Dharmachakrapravatan mudra besides the roundels. There is also an intricately carved floral creeper banding around the roundels enhancing its beauty.

Scenes

The story runs from bottom to top and is arranged clockwise.

Pre Enlightenment Life Events of Buddha

Post Enlightenment Life Events of Buddha

Buddha and Mudras

See also
 National Museum, New Delhi 
 Walrus ivory
Ivory trade

References

Indian Buddhist sculpture
National Museum, New Delhi
Ivory works of art